The 1936 Loyola Wolf Pack football team was an American football team that represented Loyola College of New Orleans (now known as Loyola University New Orleans) as a member of the Dixie Conference and the Southern Intercollegiate Athletic Association (SIAA) during the 1936 college football season. In its third season under head coach Eddie Reed, the team compiled a 4–6 record and was outscored by a total of 171 to 78. The team played its home games at Loyola University Stadium in New Orleans.

Schedule

References

Loyola
Loyola
Loyola Wolf Pack football seasons
Loyola Wolf Pack football